Frederick Belfield (1876–1921) was an English footballer who played 51 games (including 31 Midland League and 12 the Football League) and scored 10 goals (including 31 Midland League and 3 Football League) for Burslem Port Vale.

Career
Belfield joined Burslem Port Vale in September 1893. He made his debut at the Athletic Ground on 22 September 1894, in a 1–0 win over Walsall Town Swifts, and played one further Second Division games in the 1894–95 season. He played five games in the 1895–96 campaign, and scored two goals in a 4–2 win over Lincoln City at Sincil Bank on 18 April. He was a first team regular from October 1896 but broke a leg on 27 November 1897, in a friendly with rivals Stoke. Once he recovered he barely played and was instead released at the end of the 1898–99 season.

Career statistics
Source:

References

1876 births
1921 deaths
Sportspeople from Burslem
English footballers
Association football wingers
Port Vale F.C. players
Midland Football League players
English Football League players